Cole Dickerson (born October 19, 1991) is an American professional basketball player for Egis Körmend of Hungarian League.

Professional career
On August 2, 2016, Dickerson signed with Montenegrin club KK Mornar Bar. On December 9, 2016, he left Mornar after averaging 9.6 points and 3.6 rebounds per game in ten ABA League games.

On February 22, 2017, Dickerson returned to Körmend.

Honors
Egis Körmend
Magyar Kupa: 2016

References

External links
Eurobasket profile
Real GM profile
FIBA profile

1991 births
Living people
American expatriate basketball people in Finland
American expatriate basketball people in Hungary
American expatriate basketball people in Montenegro
American expatriate basketball people in the Netherlands
American men's basketball players
Basketball players from Washington (state)
BC Körmend players
Den Helder Kings players
KK Mornar Bar players
Kobrat players
People from Federal Way, Washington
San Francisco Dons men's basketball players
Small forwards